Abingdon Boys School (typeset as abingdon boys school) is the debut album by rock band Abingdon Boys School.

Overview
The initial release date was for October 10 but the album was delayed so the production staff could better promote the album. It was released on October 17, 2007 through Epic Records Japan. There are two versions, a standard edition and a limited edition, the latter containing a DVD of music videos and live performances. The album features their three previous singles, as well as a remix of b-side, "Lost Reason" featuring Micro of Home Made Kazoku. It also features a song used on a tribute album for the Nana manga as well as a cover of a Buck-Tick song, entitled .

Music style
The music is mixture of hard rock guitars and drums and electronic/techno beats. The lyrics of the songs are a mixture of English and Japanese, with the exception of Rebirth + Reverse which is an instrumental track. Athena, Via Dolorosa, Howling, Nephilim and Innocent Sorrow are sung in Japanese, except for occasional English vocals.

Track listing

Charts

Total Reported Sales: 69,796*

References

External links
 

2007 debut albums
Abingdon Boys School albums